Hörby Municipality (Hörby kommun) is a municipality in the central part of Skåne County in southern Sweden. Its seat is located in the town of Hörby.

The present municipality consists of ten original entities merged to each other in 1952, 1969 and 1974.

Geography
The geography is varied with a few forests, some lakes and streams and farmland and even wildlife. Horby is one of the most meadow-filled municipalities in Sweden.

Localities
There are 3 urban areas (also called a Tätort or locality) in Hörby Municipality. In the table they are listed according to the size of the population as of December 31, 2005. The municipal seat is in bold characters.

History
Some historians claim Hörby was founded in the 9th century A.D., but the truth is that no one knows exactly how old the village is. During the Middle Ages Hörby evolved into a centre of commerce, much due to its location, right in the middle of Skåne. The name "Hörby" comes from the old word "horg" which today would translate into "barrow" or "mound". As the name hints the woods surrounding Hörby are filled with old burial mounds (some dating back to the Bronze Age) and also some old cult places from the pre-Christian religion of asatru. The same word has given name to the neighbouring village of Höör.

Culture
Hörby Municipality still has much of the old cultural heritage remaining in the villages.

Hörby is famous for being home to one of the transmitting stations specified on old MF radio receivers. The broadcasting signals (radio, TV) are still transmitted from the Teracom transmitting station in Östra Sallerup, 7 km south of the town of Hörby. MF transmissions do not occur from Hörby any more, but from the new transmitter in Sölvesborg, inaugurated in 1985, at the coast of the Baltic Sea.

On the first Wednesday and Thursday in July every year since 1748, the Hörby Market (Hörby Marknad) is held. It attracts thousands of visitors and is one of the three main traditional markets in Skåne together with the markets of Kivik and Sjöbo.

The most famous personality from Hörby was the author Victoria Benedictsson (1850-1888).

Håkan Dahlby was born in Västerstad, in Hörby municipality.

Gallery

References
Statistics Sweden

External links

Hörby - Official site
Coat of arms

 
Municipalities of Skåne County